Emma Touny Waundjua Tuhepha (born 11 December 1974) is a Namibian HIV/AIDS activist. In 1996, she was the first Namibian woman to state publicly that she was HIV-positive. She became a high-profile activist for HIV/AIDS awareness and her efforts paid off, as anti-retroviral drugs soon arrived to treat Namibians with HIV/AIDS. In 2001, she co-founded Lironga Eparu (learn to survive), a support group for those living with HIV which also participates in advocacy, awareness raising and policy development. Tuahepa is now the National Coordinator of the Organisation.  She is from the Caprivi Region and attended the Caprivi College of Education before earning a Teaching Diploma at the Windhoek College of Education and taught briefly at Okuryangava Primary School.

References

1974 births
Living people
People from Zambezi Region
HIV/AIDS activists
People with HIV/AIDS
Namibian activists
Namibian women activists
20th-century Namibian people
20th-century Namibian women
21st-century Namibian people
21st-century Namibian women
Windhoek College of Education alumni